Šarkan is a village and municipality in the Nové Zámky District in the Nitra Region of south-west Slovakia.

History
In historical records the village was first mentioned in 1247.

Geography

The municipality lies at an elevation of 150 metres (490 ft) and covers an area of 13.638 km² (5.266 mi²). It has a population of about 353 (2006).

Ethnicity
The population is roughly 88% Hungarian and 12% Slovak.

Facilities
The village has a small public library and a football pitch.

References

External links

 http://www.statistics.sk/mosmis/eng/run.html
 Šarkan – Nové Zámky Okolie

Villages and municipalities in Nové Zámky District
Hungarian communities in Slovakia